Wor–Wic Community College is a public community college in Salisbury, Maryland. The college's name is a portmanteau of Maryland's Worcester and Wicomico counties. It was founded in 1975 and operated as a "college without walls" in the two counties for 20 years before constructing a campus in Salisbury in 1994. In 1989, state legislation was enacted to allow Somerset County residents to attend Wor-Wic at the in-county tuition rate.

In the Fall 2011 semester there were 4,063 students enrolled in credit courses and 2,382 students enrolled in non-credit courses. Wor-Wic is popular with students who plan on transferring to Salisbury University because of its proximity, inexpensive tuition, and the similarity of its general education courses to those of Salisbury University.

Academics
Wor-Wic is accredited by the Middle States Association of Colleges and Schools. Its nursing programs are approved by the Maryland Board of Nursing.  The radiologic technology program is nationally accredited by the Joint Review Committee on Education in Radiologic Technology.

Locations
Wor-Wic leases or owns various facilities which provide office, classroom, and laboratory space.
 Ocean Resorts Golf Club - Turf Management and Hospitality courses
 McCready Memorial Hospital - Emergency Medical Technician laboratory
 Parkside High School - Manufacturing Technology laboratory

Tuition
As of the Fall 2017 semester, the tuition cost is $108 per credit hour for in-county residents, $241 per credit hour for other Maryland residents, and $297 per credit hour for out-of-state students.

Governance 
The Maryland Higher Education Commission oversees and coordinates higher education in the State of Maryland including academic and financial policies at the college. A seven-member Board of Trustees, appointed by the Governor of the State of Maryland, governs the college. The college also has local sponsors, including the Worcester County Council, the Wicomico County Council, and the Wicomico County Executive.

Notable alumni
 Matthew A. Maciarello - Maryland Circuit Court Judge

References

External links
Official website

Two-year colleges in the United States
Community and junior colleges in Maryland
Buildings and structures in Salisbury, Maryland
Universities and colleges in Wicomico County, Maryland
1975 establishments in Maryland
Educational institutions established in 1975